The National Theatre of Yangon, located in Yangon,  is a national theatre of Myanmar. The theatre is used for cultural exchange programs with foreign countries, for departmental workshops, religious ceremonies, prize giving ceremonies, performing arts competitions, and for musical stage shows.

History
The theater was constructed with aid from People's Republic of China. Construction began on 3 June 1987 and completed on 30 January 1991. Of the total cost of 215.47 million kyats, the Chinese government contributed 150 million kyats and the Burmese side contributed the remainder.

Images

See also 

National Theatre of Mandalay

References

Yangon, National Theatre of Yangon
Buildings and structures in Yangon
Yangon, National Theatre of Yangon
Theatres completed in 1991
1991 establishments in Myanmar